Murliprasad Sharma, better known as Munna Bhai, is an Indian fictional character who appears in the Munna Bhai film series. The character is created by Rajkumar Hirani and portrayed by Sanjay Dutt.

Films overview
Murli Prasad Sharma (portrayed by Sanjay Dutt) is a leader in the Mumbai underworld. His nickname Munna Bhai has a double meaning; bhai literally means [brother], but in Mumbai slang it has also come to mean a hoodlum.  His sidekick is Circuit (portrayed by Arshad Warsi). They both speak in Bambaiya Hindi, a dialect specific to Mumbai, India.

Munnabhai M.B.B.S.

Munna Bhai was first introduced in the 2003 film Munna Bhai M.B.B.S. which involves his adventures as a faux medical student, who finally tells the truth about himself and learns to help people along the way.

Lage Raho Munna Bhai

In the second movie, Lage Raho Munna Bhai, Munna Bhai becomes a faux professor. He begins to have visions of Mahatma Gandhi who persuades him to stop pretending he is a professor and teaches him to help other people solve their problems through Gandhism, which Munna Bhai terms Gandhigiri.

Third Munna Bhai film 
On 25 February 2016, Sanjay Dutt was released from Yerwada Central Jail after completing his sentence (2013-2016) for illegal possession of firearms in 1993. Vidhu Vinod Chopra announced on 29 September 2016 that production on the third Munna Bhai film, again starring Dutt in the title role, will begin in 2017.

TV commercial
A television commercial named "Munna Bhai fight against dengue" made by the Minister of Health and Family Welfare (India) in 2016 features 'Munna Bhai' and 'Circuit'. It was made to create awareness of dengue fever.

Popularity
The character Munna Bhai was counted as one of top 20 fictional characters in Bollywood The film Lage Raho Munna Bhai popularized the term Gandhigiri.

See also
Laxman Gole a contemporary Indian Gandhian who has been described as the real-life Munnabhai.

Notes

External links
 Murliprasad 'Munna Bhai' Sharma at Internet Movie Database

Indian film characters
Fictional Indian people
Film characters introduced in 2003
Fictional con artists
Fictional gangsters
Sanjay Dutt